Thomas Vinterberg (born 19 May 1969) is a Danish film director who, along with Lars von Trier, co-founded the Dogme 95 movement in filmmaking, which established rules for simplifying movie production. He is best known for the films The Celebration (1998), Submarino (2010), The Hunt (2012), Far from the Madding Crowd (2015), and Another Round (2020). For Another Round, he was nominated for the Academy Award for Best Director (the first Danish filmmaker nominated for the Best Director category) and won the Academy Award for Best International Feature Film.

Life and career 
Vinterberg was born in Frederiksberg, Denmark.

The film won awards at the 1994 Nordisk Panorama Film Festival, the International Short Film Festival in Clermont-Ferrand, and the Toronto International Film Festival.

His first feature film was The Biggest Heroes (De Største Helte), a road movie that received acclaim in his native Denmark.

In 1995, Vinterberg formed the Dogme 95 movement with Lars von Trier, Kristian Levring, and Søren Kragh-Jacobsen.

Following that dogma in 1998, he conceived, wrote and directed (and also had a small acting role in) the first of the Dogme movies, The Celebration (Festen). As per the rules of the Dogme manifesto, he did not take a directorial credit. However, he and the film won numerous nominations and awards, including the Jury Prize at the 1998 Cannes Film Festival.

At the turn of the century, Vinterberg participated in the experimental broadcast D-dag, where he and three other filmmakers directed broadcasts on four different channels, with the viewer able to switch between them and create their own viewing experience. A final edit was released in 2001.

In 2003, he directed the apocalyptic science fiction romance-drama It's All About Love, a film he wrote, directed and produced himself over a period of five years. The film was entirely in English and featured, among others, Joaquin Phoenix, Claire Danes, and Sean Penn. The movie did not do well, as critics and audiences found it idiosyncratic and somewhat incomprehensible.

His next film, the English-language Dear Wendy (2005), scripted by Lars von Trier, had poor ticket sales in his native Denmark where it sold only 14,521 tickets. However he won the Silver George for Best Director at the 27th Moscow International Film Festival. Vinterberg then tried to retrace his roots with a smaller Danish-language production, En mand kommer hjem (2007), which also had poor ticket sales in his native Denmark, selling only 31,232 tickets.

On 1 August 2008, he directed the music video for "The Day That Never Comes", the first single off Metallica's album Death Magnetic.

His 2010 film Submarino was nominated for the Golden Bear at the 60th Berlin International Film Festival.

In 2012, his film The Hunt competed for the Palme d'Or at the 2012 Cannes Film Festival and was nominated for Best Foreign Language Film at the 86th Academy Awards.

In 2015, he directed Far from the Madding Crowd, an adaptation of the acclaimed Thomas Hardy novel, starring Carey Mulligan, Matthias Schoenaerts, Michael Sheen and Tom Sturridge.

Vinterberg reunited with Matthias Schoenaerts in Kursk, a film about the Kursk submarine disaster that happened in 2000.

In 2019, Vinterberg lost his daughter Ida in a car accident while she was traveling home from Belgium with her mother. As such, he dedicated Another Round (Druk) to her, while filming much of the film in her school with her classmates. Vinterberg was nominated for the Academy Award for Best Director for the film, which also won the BAFTA Award for Best Film Not in the English Language. He also won the Academy Award for Best International Feature Film; he dedicated the award to Ida.

He is currently developing his first foray into directing for TV with an original six-episode series called Families Like Ours which explores a near-future Denmark when the country is gradually evacuated due to rising sea levels.

Honours 
In April 2016, the French government appointed Vinterberg a Chevalier of the Ordre des Arts et des Lettres.

Filmography 
Short filmFeature filmTelevision'''

References

External links 

 
 CNN interview with Thomas Vinterberg
 
 Thomas Vinterberg: About a scene by Ingmar Bergman Video interview by Louisiana Channel, 2013

1969 births
Living people
Chevaliers of the Ordre des Arts et des Lettres
Danish film producers
Danish male screenwriters
21st-century Danish screenwriters
Directors of Best Foreign Language Film Academy Award winners
European Film Award for Best Screenwriter winners
Film directors from Copenhagen
People from Frederiksberg